Moldova's postal codes are alphanumeric, consisting of the  letters MD followed by a dash followed by four digits, e.g. Chișinău MD-2001.  

The first digit refers to a designated postal zone, the rest designate smaller administrative units or districts and streets within the municipal area.

See also
 Official site of Poșta Moldovei

Moldova
Communications in Moldova